Aenetus mirabilis is a moth of the family Hepialidae. It is known from Queensland.

The larvae feed on Alphitonia species. They bore in the stems of trees and saplings.

References

Moths described in 1894
Hepialidae